Stanislav Vyacheslavovich Zabrodsky (Cyrillic:Станислав Вячеславович Забродский ; born 1 January 1962, Kharkiv, Ukrainian SSR, Soviet Union) is a retired archer.  Zabrodsky represented three countries (Unified Team, Ukraine and Kazakhstan) at four Summer Olympics in 1992, 1996, 2000 and 2004. He also represented the Soviet Union at pre-1992 tournaments, including at the 1989 World Archery Championships, where he won two gold medals and broke four world records.

References

1962 births
Soviet male archers
Ukrainian male archers
Kazakhstani male archers
Living people
Sportspeople from Kharkiv
Archers at the 1992 Summer Olympics
Archers at the 1996 Summer Olympics
Archers at the 2000 Summer Olympics
Archers at the 2004 Summer Olympics
Olympic archers of the Unified Team
Olympic archers of Ukraine
Olympic archers of Kazakhstan
Asian Games medalists in archery
Archers at the 2002 Asian Games
World Archery Championships medalists
Asian Games bronze medalists for Kazakhstan
Medalists at the 2002 Asian Games
Ukrainian emigrants to Kazakhstan